The ArenaBowl was the championship game of the Arena Football League.  Originally hosted at Pittsburgh's Civic Arena based on home attendance during the inaugural 1987 season, save four years (2005–2008) the game was hosted by the team with the higher seed based on regular season performance.  In 2005–2006 the league staged the game in Las Vegas, and in 2007–2008 New Orleans hosted the event.  For the series final two games, regular season home attendance between the competing teams determined which would host.

Originally using year-based nomenclature ("ArenaBowl '87"), the league would begin consistently referring to the game using roman numerals beginning in 1994 ("ArenaBowl VIII").  The original Arena Football League's 2009 bankruptcy liquidation brought the league's existence to a close, but ArenaBowl XXIII would be staged in 2010 as the championship game of a new league which assumed the AFL's intellectual properties.  The final ten games of the series would be staged under the "new" Arena Football League, concluding with ArenaBowl XXXII between the Albany Empire and Philadelphia Soul.  The second AFL ultimately had the same fate as the first, ceasing operations after its 2019 season and undergoing Chapter 7 bankruptcy liquidation.

While the intellectual property rights to the names of the Arena Football League and the ArenaBowl were sold through the league's bankruptcy proceeding in 2020, no plans have been disclosed to revive the game a second time.

Results

* Neutral site
 The first seven ArenaBowls were known by the year in which they were played (i.e. ArenaBowl I was called ArenaBowl '87). ArenaBowl VIII was the first to carry a roman numeral, and all previous games were retconned to have roman numerals as well.
 The number in parentheses indicates the amount of ArenaBowl MVPs that player won.
 The Pittsburgh Gladiators relocated in 1991 to become the Tampa Bay Storm.
 The Nashville Kats relocated in 2002 to become the Georgia Force. The Kats were brought back as an expansion team in 2005 and assumed all former team history up to the point when the original Kats relocated to Georgia. The Force were regarded as a completely separate team and kept records from their establishment in 2002 to the team's demise in 2012, similar to the Cleveland Browns and Baltimore Ravens situation in the NFL.

Most championships won

Standings

*Includes two appearances as Pittsburgh Gladiators (0–2, 42 points, 84 points allowed).

Coaching records

*Both Haering and Jackson coached the 1989 Pittsburgh Gladiators, but Jackson is credited with the postseason games.

See also
 List of ArenaBowl broadcasters
 List of Arena Football League seasons

References

External links
 ArenaBowl.com
 Arena Football League

 
Recurring sporting events established in 1987
Recurring sporting events disestablished in 2019
Indoor American football competitions
American football bowls
1987 establishments in the United States
2019 disestablishments in the United States